St. Athanasius' Church (is an Orthodox church in Moscopole, Albania.

History and description
The church was erected in 1721. The church now serves as a cemetery church in Moscopole. It is a basilica-type church, with a central nave and two lateral aisles, and is found in the northeastern side of Moscopole, at the Akamnel neighborhood. The church has two cupolas that stay on two main pillars and eight surrounding columns. The dimensions of the two naves are 19m x 10.50m x 8m, and the length of the cupolas goes up to 9m. The apses are decorated externally by seven arches at the main entrance and four arches ones on each side. The side arches are topped by small windows. The cloister is 18.90m long dhe 2.85m large, surrounded by 6 arches, which stand on 5 columns, each covered by a double capitals.

The church was declared a Cultural Monument of Albania. however its icons have been stolen 5 times from 1990 to 2010. The last theft removed from the church icons painted in 1724.

References

Cultural Monuments of Albania
Eastern Orthodox church buildings in Albania
Churches in Moscopole
Churches in Korçë County